The Lettre Ulysses Award for the Art of Reportage has been given annually since 2003 for the best texts in the genre of literary reportage, which must have been first published during the previous two years. The award was initiated by Lettre International in Berlin, and is organized by the Foundation Lettre International Award, a joint partnership between Lettre International and the Aventis Foundation. The Goethe-Institut also cooperates with the project.

A polyglot jury of experienced writers representing eleven of the major linguistic regions of the world seeks the best international texts in the genre and decides on a shortlist of seven, eventually choosing three winners from among them. The members of the jury are appointed by the organizer. In addition, an advisory committee of distinguished writers lends its moral and intellectual backing to the Lettre Ulysses Award. Members of the committee have included Günter Grass, the German writer and winner of the 1999 Nobel Prize in Literature, the Polish reportage author Ryszard Kapuściński, the French ethnologist Jean Malaurie, and the Belarusian writer Svetlana Aleksievich.

The Lettre Ulysses Award is the first world prize in the reportage genre.

The initiave ended in 2007, after the contract between the Foundation Lettre International Award and the Aventis Foundation ended and the foundation did not succeed in finding a new partner.

Award ceremony and prizes
The prize winners are announced at a public award ceremony in Berlin on the Saturday before the opening of the international Frankfurt Book Fair. The winners of the first, second and third prizes are given cash awards amounting to $50,000, $30,000 and US$20,000, respectively. Residencies in Berlin are awarded to the other four finalists.

Mission
The Lettre Ulysses Award aims to:

Nomination and selection process
The jury is composed of writers and journalists who work within the reportage genre. Their conference language is English, but they are native speakers drawn from the world's largest linguistic regions and as such guarantee the broadest possible language base. Each jury member is able to make up to two nominations for the award. Although it is likely that jury members will nominate from their own language group, in practice they can nominate works written in whichever languages they read. The composition of the jury and the languages represented are subject to partial annual change.

Each jury member justifies his or her nominations in a written proposal accompanied by extracts of each text. These are, if necessary, translated into English and sent out to each jury member. Following the nominations, the first jury meeting is held. The number of nominees is reduced and a shortlist is drawn up after discussions centering on the criteria: relevance of subject; originality; complexity; credibility and authenticity; structure; language and style; and whatever other elements make a particular work outstanding. The shortlist contains seven texts. These texts are then translated in their entirety, if necessary, and sent to all jury members. The final decisions are made after all candidate texts have been entirely and thoroughly read by each and every jury member.

Past winners

2003
 1st prize. Anna Politkovskaya, Tchétchénie: le déshonneur russe, (Buchet/Chastel, Paris, 2003).
 2nd prize. Nuruddin Farah, Yesterday Tomorrow: Voices from the Somali Diaspora, (Continuum International, London, New York, 2000).
 3rd prize. Jiang Hao, Revealing the Secrets of Poachers, (Qunzhong chubansche, Beijing, 2000).

2004
 1st prize. Chen Guidi and Wu Chuntao, Survey of Chinese Peasants, (People's Literature Publication Company, Beijing 2003).
 2nd prize. Tracy Kidder, Mountains Beyond Mountains: The Quest of Dr. Paul Farmer, a Man Who Would Cure the World, (Random House, New York, 2003). 
 3rd prize. Daniel Bergner, Soldiers of Light (Allen Lane/Penguin, London, 2004).

2005
 1st prize. Alexandra Fuller, Scribbling the Cat. Travels with an African Soldier, (Penguin Press, New York, 2004).
 2nd prize. Abdellah Hammoudi, Une saison à la Mecque. Récit de pèlerinage, (Seuil, Paris, 2004) [A Season in Mecca. Account of a Pilgrimage].
 3rd prize. Riverbend, Baghdad Burning. Girl Blog from Iraq, (The Feminist Press, New York, 2005. Published in the UK by Marion Boyars Publishers, London, 2005).

2006
 1st prize. Linda Grant, The People on the Street. A Writer’s View of Israel, (Virago Press, London, 2006).
 2nd prize. Érik Orsenna, Voyage aux pays du coton. Petit précis de mondialisation, (Fayard, Paris, 2006) [Journey to the Lands of Cotton. A Brief Manual of Globalisation].
 3rd prize. Juanita León, País de plomo. Crónicas de guerra, (Aguilar, 2005) [Country of Bullets. War Diaries].

See also
 Reportage
 Creative nonfiction
 New Journalism
 Lettre International (Berlin)

References

External links
 Lettre Ulysses Award for the Art of Reportage — official site
 Lettre International (Berlin) — official site
 Guardian story on 'Riverbend'

Journalism awards
Awards established in 2003
German literary awards